Tanjung Balau is a beach town in Kota Tinggi District, Johor, Malaysia.

In April 2019, Johor Marine Department detected an oil spill off the coast of Tanjung Balau, covering 4 mautical miles from an estimated 300 tonnes of spilled marine fuel oil.

Tourist attractions
 Tanjung Balau Beach
 Tanjung Balau Fishermen Museum

References 

Kota Tinggi District
Towns in Johor